The 2018 Big Ten softball tournament was held at Goodman Softball Complex on the campus of University of Wisconsin in Madison, Wisconsin from May 10 through May 12, 2018. As the tournament winner, Minnesota earned the Big Ten Conference's automatic bid to the 2018 NCAA Division I softball tournament. All games of the tournament aired on BTN.

Tournament

Only the top 12 participate in the tournament, therefore Rutgers and Penn State were not eligible to play.

Schedule

References

https://web.archive.org/web/20180510092108/http://www.bigten.org/sports/w-softbl/spec-rel/050618aad.html
http://uwbadgers.com/sports/2018/3/5/softball-tournament-central.aspx

Tournament
Big Ten softball tournament